This is a list of the breeds of ass or donkey usually considered to originate in Spain and Portugal.

References

 
Donkey
 
Donkey